The Yesipov Letopis (Есиповская летопись in Russian) is one of the Siberian Letopises, dedicated to the memory of Yermak. It was compiled in 1636 by Savva Yesipov, a podyachy of the Siberian archbishop Nectarius.

East Slavic chronicles
17th-century history books
History of Siberia
1636 books
History books about the 16th  century